Captieux is a commune of Southwestern France, located in the Gironde department, Nouvelle-Aquitaine (before 2015: Aquitaine).

It lies near the border with the Landes and the Lot-et-Garonne departments.

The commune is in the east of the Parc naturel régional des Landes de Gascogne.

Between 1950 and 1967, the U.S. Army's 23,000-acre 571st Ordnance Ammunition Command (Captieux Ordnance Depot) was situated southwest of the village.

Population

See also
Communes of the Gironde department
Parc naturel régional des Landes de Gascogne

References

Communes of Gironde